The QF 3-pounder Nordenfelt was a light 47 mm quick-firing naval gun and coast defence gun of the late 19th century used by many countries.

United Kingdom 
The United Kingdom only deployed this gun for coast defence, and soon discarded it in favour of the similar QF 3-pounder Hotchkiss gun for both coast defence and naval use.

Ammunition 
Ammunition was in "fixed rounds" : the projectile and brass cartridge case were loaded as a single unit. The gun used the same ammunition as the similar QF 3-pounder Hotchkiss, with either Nordenfelt or Hotchkiss fuzes. When introduced in the 1880s the propellant used was gunpowder, in British service Cordite Mark I was used as propellant from the mid-1890s onwards.

See also 
 List of naval guns

Weapons of comparable role, performance and era 
 QF 3-pounder Hotchkiss : Hotchkiss equivalent

Notes

References

Bibliography 
 I.V. Hogg and L.F. Thurston, British Artillery Weapons & Ammunition 1914–1918. London: Ian Allan, 1972.

External links 

 Handbook of the 3-pounder Nordenfelt quick-firing gun. Land service, 1891

Victorian-era weapons of the United Kingdom
47 mm artillery
Coastal artillery